Lake Byron is a lake in Beadle County, South Dakota, U.S.; it is fed by Foster Creek and feeds out to the James River.

The lake derives its name of Byron Pay, who stayed briefly at the lake in the 1860s and left his name carved on a tree there.

The Albert S. Piper Homestead Claim Shanty is about two miles north, and the Milford Hutterite Colony is to the northeast.

Fish 

Species of game fish in the lake include walleye, yellow perch, and black crappies. The lake also supports populations of Northern pike, black bullheads, and common carp. The lake is relatively shallow, and a number of winter-related fish kills have occurred there.

Lake Byron contains a public access boat ramp and is the location of 'Byron Bible Camp'.

See also
List of lakes in South Dakota
Bethel Church

References

Bodies of water of Beadle County, South Dakota
Byron